ATIS or Atis may refer to:

Organizations 
Adirondack Trail Improvement Society, a nonprofit organization for trail maintenance in the Adirondack High Peaks area
Alliance for Telecommunications Industry Solutions, a standards organization for the telecommunications industry
Allied Translator and Interpreter Section, a joint Australian/American  intelligence agency that translated intercepted Japanese communications during World War II
Association of Translators and Interpreters of Saskatchewan, an organization of language professionals, see Canadian Translators, Terminologists and Interpreters Council

Science and technology 
Automatic Terminal Information Service (aircraft), a broadcast of recorded aeronautical information such as weather at airports
Automatic Transmitter Identification System (television), used for the station identification of television channels carried on analog satellite TV
Automatic Transmitter Identification System (marine), ship and transmitter post-transmission identification used on European waterways
Advanced Traveller Information System, a feature of Intelligent Transportation Systems

Other uses 
Adventure Thru Inner Space, a former attraction in Disneyland's Tomorrowland
Aeta, or Atis, an indigenous people who live in isolated mountainous parts of the Philippines
Sugar-apple, or Atis, a fruit from the Philippines
Hatis, a town in Armenia
Sky Atis, a Czech paraglider design

See also 

 Atys (disambiguation)